JS Chiyoda (ASR-404) is a submarine rescue ship of Japan Maritime Self-Defense Force.

Development and design 
It was built as a replacement for the dilapidated submarine rescue ship JS Chiyoda. In terms of design, it is said to be an expanded version of the submarine rescue ship JS Chihaya.

The appearance is almost the same as Chihaya, but the mast has been changed to a tower shape. Both the installed DSRV and ROV are new, and the number of people that can be rescued by one dive has been increased from 12 to 16 on the Chihaya-equipped boat, and the battery has been changed from a silver / zinc secondary battery to a lithium-ion secondary battery. We changed it to shorten the charging time. ROVs have significantly improved mobility and search ability, making it possible to accurately check the status of distressed submarines that DSRVs have traditionally been in charge of.

Like the older Chiyoda and Chihaya , the ship has a Deep Submergence Rescue Vehicle (DSRV) to rescue the crew of the submarine, as well as a new remotely operated vehicle (Remotely Operated). It will also be equipped with a complete set of submersible rescue devices (DSRS) including Vehicle, ROV). Equipped with three recompression tanks for diving disease treatment for post-rescue response.

However, the submarine's functions such as refueling the submarine, torpedoes, fresh water and accommodation and rest facilities for the submarine crew, which were in the older Chiyoda, are omitted.

In addition, in the event of a large-scale disaster, it will be used as a base for medical support, livelihood support for disaster victims, and bathing support. Like Chiyoda (56AS) / Chihaya (08ASR), its capabilities will be further strengthened. Two surgical beds and about 10 beds are installed for this purpose.

The main engine is the same diesel as Chihaya, but the fuel tank has been enlarged to have a sufficient cruising range even at high speeds, and it has become possible to reach destinations such as rescue areas quickly.

Construction and career
Chiyoda was laid down on 13 October 2015 at Mitsui Engineering and Shipbuilding, Tamano and launched on 17 October 2016. The vessel was commissioned on 20 March 2018.

After 15:00 on 1 May 2018, five men and women fell from a pleasure boat sailing in the vicinity while anchoring off the coast of Ito Port in Shizuoka Prefecture for a temporary stay for individual ship training in the north of Hatsushima, Sagami Bay. The crew visually recognized it, and to rescue the drowning man, they lowered the work boat from the ship and carried out rescue and rescue activities. On June 14, the same year, Japan-US hygiene joint training was conducted with the Self-Defense Forces Yokosuka Hospital, Yokosuka US Navy Hospital, and the US Navy Mercy-clas hospital ship USNS Mercy.

Before dawn on 26 May 2019, two cargo ships collided at sea about 11 km south of Inubosaki in Choshi City, Chiba Prefecture. The captain, who was rescued about two hours after the sinking of the Chikatsu Maru (5-seater, 499 tons) owned by Katsumaru Kaiun in Imabari City, Ehime Prefecture, said, "Everyone was on board when the collision occurred." , one was found on board the ship on the 26th and was confirmed dead, but a sound was heard in the second Japan Coast Guard diver's investigation from around 0:30 pm on the 27th, and even after five dives in the room. I confirmed the sound near a certain stern. When a diver hits the hull with a plastic hammer three to four times, a slight tapping sound is heard after a few seconds, and the missing person may be in a place where air remains on the ship. The person is rescued soon after. From October 16 to December 7 of the same year, she  was dispatched to participate in the 8th Western Pacific Submarine Rescue Training (Pacific Reach 2019) sponsored by the Royal Australian Navy. The training will be conducted from November 4 to November 15 in the waters west of Perth, Australia, and the participating countries will be the United States, the Australian Federation, the Republic of Korea, the Republic of Singapore, Malaysia and 20 observer participating countries in addition to Japan. Submarine rescue training, search and rescue demonstrations for distressed submarines, etc.

Gallery

References

2016 ships
Ships built by Mitsui Engineering and Shipbuilding
Auxiliary ships of the Japan Maritime Self-Defense Force
Submarine rescue ships